Poste Maurice Cortier was a desert halt in the Sahara Desert in southern Algeria, along the way from Algiers to French Sudan.

It became popularly known as Bidon 5 because its sign board was an empty gas-can with the numeral 5 painted upon it; and "bidon" is French for "gas-can".

References 
It is mentioned in Arthur Mee's 2 volume work 1000 Heroes: Immortal men & women of every age & every land. Page 284 and in William B. Seabrook's Air Adventure.

Geography of Algeria